Naturally occurring palladium (46Pd) is composed of six stable isotopes, 102Pd, 104Pd, 105Pd, 106Pd, 108Pd, and 110Pd, although 102Pd and 110Pd are theoretically unstable. The most stable radioisotopes are 107Pd with a half-life of 6.5 million years, 103Pd with a half-life of 17 days, and 100Pd with a half-life of 3.63 days. Twenty-three other radioisotopes have been characterized with atomic weights ranging from 90.949 u (91Pd) to 128.96 u (129Pd). Most of these have half-lives that are less than a half an hour except 101Pd (half-life: 8.47 hours), 109Pd (half-life: 13.7 hours), and 112Pd (half-life: 21 hours).

The primary decay mode before the most abundant stable isotope, 106Pd, is electron capture and the primary mode after is beta decay. The primary decay product before 106Pd is rhodium and the primary product after is silver.

Radiogenic 107Ag is a decay product of 107Pd and was first discovered in the Santa Clara meteorite of 1978. The discoverers suggest that the coalescence and differentiation of iron-cored small planets may have occurred 10 million years after a nucleosynthetic event. 107Pd versus Ag correlations observed in bodies, which have clearly been melted since accretion of the Solar System, must reflect the presence of short-lived nuclides in the early Solar System.

List of isotopes 

|-
| 91Pd
| style="text-align:right" | 46
| style="text-align:right" | 45
| 90.94911(61)#
| 10# ms [>1.5 µs]
| β+
| 91Rh
| 7/2+#
|
|
|-
| 92Pd
| style="text-align:right" | 46
| style="text-align:right" | 46
| 91.94042(54)#
| 1.1(3) s [0.7(+4−2) s]
| β+
| 92Rh
| 0+
|
|
|-
| 93Pd
| style="text-align:right" | 46
| style="text-align:right" | 47
| 92.93591(43)#
| 1.07(12) s
| β+
| 93Rh
| (9/2+)
|
|
|-
| style="text-indent:1em" | 93mPd
| colspan="3" style="text-indent:2em" | 0+X keV
| 9.3(+25−17) s
|
|
|
|
|
|-
| 94Pd
| style="text-align:right" | 46
| style="text-align:right" | 48
| 93.92877(43)#
| 9.0(5) s
| β+
| 94Rh
| 0+
|
|
|-
| style="text-indent:1em" | 94mPd
| colspan="3" style="text-indent:2em" | 4884.4(5) keV
| 530(10) ns
|
|
| (14+)
|
|
|-
| 95Pd
| style="text-align:right" | 46
| style="text-align:right" | 49
| 94.92469(43)#
| 10# s
| β+
| 95Rh
| 9/2+#
|
|
|-
| rowspan=3 style="text-indent:1em" | 95mPd
| rowspan=3 colspan="3" style="text-indent:2em" | 1860(500)# keV
| rowspan=3|13.3(3) s
| β+ (94.1%)
| 95Rh
| rowspan=3|(21/2+)
| rowspan=3|
| rowspan=3|
|-
| IT (5%)
| 95Pd
|-
| β+, p (.9%)
| 94Ru
|-
| 96Pd
| style="text-align:right" | 46
| style="text-align:right" | 50
| 95.91816(16)
| 122(2) s
| β+
| 96Rh
| 0+
|
|
|-
| style="text-indent:1em" | 96mPd
| colspan="3" style="text-indent:2em" | 2530.8(1) keV
| 1.81(1) µs
|
|
| 8+
|
|
|-
| 97Pd
| style="text-align:right" | 46
| style="text-align:right" | 51
| 96.91648(32)
| 3.10(9) min
| β+
| 97Rh
| 5/2+#
|
|
|-
| 98Pd
| style="text-align:right" | 46
| style="text-align:right" | 52
| 97.912721(23)
| 17.7(3) min
| β+
| 98Rh
| 0+
|
|
|-
| 99Pd
| style="text-align:right" | 46
| style="text-align:right" | 53
| 98.911768(16)
| 21.4(2) min
| β+
| 99Rh
| (5/2)+
|
|
|-
| 100Pd
| style="text-align:right" | 46
| style="text-align:right" | 54
| 99.908506(12)
| 3.63(9) d
| EC
| 100Rh
| 0+
|
|
|-
| 101Pd
| style="text-align:right" | 46
| style="text-align:right" | 55
| 100.908289(19)
| 8.47(6) h
| β+
| 101Rh
| 5/2+
|
|
|-
| 102Pd
| style="text-align:right" | 46
| style="text-align:right" | 56
| 101.905609(3)
| colspan=3 align=center|Observationally Stable
| 0+
| 0.0102(1)
|
|-
| 103Pd
| style="text-align:right" | 46
| style="text-align:right" | 57
| 102.906087(3)
| 16.991(19) d
| EC
| 103Rh
| 5/2+
|
|
|-
| style="text-indent:1em" | 103mPd
| colspan="3" style="text-indent:2em" | 784.79(10) keV
| 25(2) ns
|
|
| 11/2−
|
|
|-
| 104Pd
| style="text-align:right" | 46
| style="text-align:right" | 58
| 103.904036(4)
| colspan=3 align=center|Stable
| 0+
| 0.1114(8)
|
|-
| 105Pd
| style="text-align:right" | 46
| style="text-align:right" | 59
| 104.905085(4)
| colspan=3 align=center|Stable
| 5/2+
| 0.2233(8)
|
|-
| 106Pd
| style="text-align:right" | 46
| style="text-align:right" | 60
| 105.903486(4)
| colspan=3 align=center|Stable
| 0+
| 0.2733(3)
|
|-
| 107Pd
| style="text-align:right" | 46
| style="text-align:right" | 61
| 106.905133(4)
| 6.5(3)×106 y
| β−
| 107Ag
| 5/2+
| trace
|
|-
| style="text-indent:1em" | 107m1Pd
| colspan="3" style="text-indent:2em" | 115.74(12) keV
| 0.85(10) µs
|
|
| 1/2+
|
|
|-
| style="text-indent:1em" | 107m2Pd
| colspan="3" style="text-indent:2em" | 214.6(3) keV
| 21.3(5) s
| IT
| 107Pd
| 11/2−
|
|
|-
| 108Pd
| style="text-align:right" | 46
| style="text-align:right" | 62
| 107.903892(4)
| colspan=3 align=center|Stable
| 0+
| 0.2646(9)
|
|-
| 109Pd
| style="text-align:right" | 46
| style="text-align:right" | 63
| 108.905950(4)
| 13.7012(24) h
| β−
| 109mAg
| 5/2+
|
|
|-
| style="text-indent:1em" | 109m1Pd
| colspan="3" style="text-indent:2em" | 113.400(10) keV
| 380(50) ns
|
|
| 1/2+
|
|
|-
| style="text-indent:1em" | 109m2Pd
| colspan="3" style="text-indent:2em" | 188.990(10) keV
| 4.696(3) min
| IT
| 109Pd
| 11/2−
|
|
|-
| 110Pd
| style="text-align:right" | 46
| style="text-align:right" | 64
| 109.905153(12)
| colspan=3 align=center|Observationally Stable
| 0+
| 0.1172(9)
|
|-
| 111Pd
| style="text-align:right" | 46
| style="text-align:right" | 65
| 110.907671(12)
| 23.4(2) min
| β−
| 111mAg
| 5/2+
|
|
|-
| rowspan=2 style="text-indent:1em" | 111mPd
| rowspan=2 colspan="3" style="text-indent:2em" | 172.18(8) keV
| rowspan=2|5.5(1) h
| IT
| 111Pd
| rowspan=2|11/2−
| rowspan=2|
| rowspan=2|
|-
| β−
| 111mAg
|- 
| 112Pd
| style="text-align:right" | 46
| style="text-align:right" | 66
| 111.907314(19)
| 21.03(5) h
| β−
| 112Ag
| 0+
|
|
|-
| 113Pd
| style="text-align:right" | 46
| style="text-align:right" | 67
| 112.91015(4)
| 93(5) s
| β−
| 113mAg
| (5/2+)
|
|
|-
| style="text-indent:1em" | 113mPd
| colspan="3" style="text-indent:2em" | 81.1(3) keV
| 0.3(1) s
| IT
| 113Pd
| (9/2−)
|
|
|-
| 114Pd
| style="text-align:right" | 46
| style="text-align:right" | 68
| 113.910363(25)
| 2.42(6) min
| β−
| 114Ag
| 0+
|
|
|-
| 115Pd
| style="text-align:right" | 46
| style="text-align:right" | 69
| 114.91368(7)
| 25(2) s
| β−
| 115mAg
| (5/2+)#
|
|
|-
| rowspan=2 style="text-indent:1em" | 115mPd
| rowspan=2 colspan="3" style="text-indent:2em" | 89.18(25) keV
| rowspan=2|50(3) s
| β− (92%)
| 115Ag
| rowspan=2|(11/2−)#
| rowspan=2|
| rowspan=2|
|-
| IT (8%)
| 115Pd
|-
| 116Pd
| style="text-align:right" | 46
| style="text-align:right" | 70
| 115.91416(6)
| 11.8(4) s
| β−
| 116Ag
| 0+
|
|
|-
| 117Pd
| style="text-align:right" | 46
| style="text-align:right" | 71
| 116.91784(6)
| 4.3(3) s
| β−
| 117mAg
| (5/2+)
|
|
|-
| style="text-indent:1em" | 117mPd
| colspan="3" style="text-indent:2em" | 203.2(3) keV
| 19.1(7) ms
| IT
| 117Pd
| (11/2−)#
|
|
|-
| 118Pd
| style="text-align:right" | 46
| style="text-align:right" | 72
| 117.91898(23)
| 1.9(1) s
| β−
| 118Ag
| 0+
|
|
|-
| 119Pd
| style="text-align:right" | 46
| style="text-align:right" | 73
| 118.92311(32)#
| 0.92(13) s
| β−
| 119Ag
|
|
|
|-
| 120Pd
| style="text-align:right" | 46
| style="text-align:right" | 74
| 119.92469(13)
| 0.5(1) s
| β−
| 120Ag
| 0+
|
|
|-
| 121Pd
| style="text-align:right" | 46
| style="text-align:right" | 75
| 120.92887(54)#
| 285 ms
| β−
| 121Ag
|
|
|
|-
| 122Pd
| style="text-align:right" | 46
| style="text-align:right" | 76
| 121.93055(43)#
| 175 ms [>300 ns]
| β−
| 122Ag
| 0+
|
|
|-
| 123Pd
| style="text-align:right" | 46
| style="text-align:right" | 77
| 122.93493(64)#
| 108 ms
| β−
| 123Ag
|
|
|
|-
| 124Pd
| style="text-align:right" | 46
| style="text-align:right" | 78
| 123.93688(54)#
| 38 ms
| β−
| 124Ag
| 0+
|
|
|-
| 125Pd
| style="text-align:right" | 46
| style="text-align:right" | 79
|
| 57 ms
| β−
| 125Ag
|
|
|
|-
| 126Pd
| style="text-align:right" | 46
| style="text-align:right" | 80
|
| 48.6 ms
| β−
| 126Ag
| 0+
|
|
|-
| style="text-indent:1em" | 126m1Pd
| colspan="3" style="text-indent:2em" | 2023 keV
| 330 ns
| IT
| 126Pd
| 5−
|
|
|-
| style="text-indent:1em" | 126m2Pd
| colspan="3" style="text-indent:2em" | 2110 keV
| 440 ns
| IT
| 126m1Pd
| 7−
|
|
|-
| 127Pd
| style="text-align:right" | 46
| style="text-align:right" | 81
|
| 38 ms
| β−
| 127Ag
|
|
|
|-
| 128Pd
| style="text-align:right" | 46
| style="text-align:right" | 82
|
| 35 ms
| β−
| 128Ag
| 0+
|
|
|-
| style="text-indent:1em" | 128mPd
| colspan="3" style="text-indent:2em" | 2151 keV
| 5.8 µs
| IT
| 128Pd
| 8+
|
|
|-
| 129Pd
| style="text-align:right" | 46
| style="text-align:right" | 83
|
| 31 ms
| β−
| 129Ag
|
|
|

Palladium-103
Palladium-103 is a radioisotope of the element palladium that has uses in radiation therapy for prostate cancer and uveal melanoma. Palladium-103 may be created from palladium-102 or from rhodium-103 using a cyclotron. Palladium-103 has a half-life of 16.99 days and decays by electron capture to rhodium-103, emitting characteristic x-rays with 21 keV of energy.

Palladium-107

Palladium-107 is the second-longest lived (half-life of 6.5 million years) and least radioactive (decay energy only 33 keV, specific activity 5 Ci/g) of the 7 long-lived fission products. It undergoes pure beta decay (without gamma radiation) to 107Ag, which is stable.

Its yield from thermal neutron fission of uranium-235 is 0.1629% per fission, only 1/4 that of iodine-129, and only 1/40 those of 99Tc, 93Zr, and 135Cs. Yield from 233U is slightly lower, but yield from 239Pu is much higher, 3.3%. Fast fission or fission of some heavier actinides[which?] will produce palladium-107 at higher yields.

One source estimates that palladium produced from fission contains the isotopes 104Pd (16.9%),105Pd (29.3%), 106Pd (21.3%), 107Pd (17%), 108Pd (11.7%) and 110Pd (3.8%). According to another source, the proportion of 107Pd is 9.2% for palladium from thermal neutron fission of 235U, 11.8% for 233U, and 20.4% for 239Pu (and the 239Pu yield of palladium is about 10 times that of 235U).

Because of this dilution and because 105Pd has 11 times the neutron absorption cross section, 107Pd is not amenable to disposal by nuclear transmutation. However, as a noble metal, palladium is not as mobile in the environment as iodine or technetium.

References
Patent application for Palladium-103 implantable radiation-delivery device (accessed 12/7/05)

 Isotope masses from:

 Isotopic compositions and standard atomic masses from:

 Half-life, spin, and isomer data selected from the following sources.

 
Palladium
Palladium